Liping Airport  is an airport serving Liping County, part of the Qiandongnan Miao and Dong Autonomous Prefecture in Guizhou Province, China. The airport cost ¥240 million to build and was opened on November 6, 2005.

Airlines and destinations

See also
List of airports in China
List of the busiest airports in China

References

Airports in Guizhou
Airports established in 2005
2005 establishments in China
Liping County